Serasa Beach is a 1.5 km long artificial split off the Serasa Bay, Mukim Serasa, Brunei-Muara District, Brunei. The beach also lies a few minutes from Muara port and town.

The Royal Brunei Yacht Club, Royal Brunei Windsurfing Association and Serasa Water Sports Complex are present in the vicinity of the beach. It is noted that the beach is known for windsurfing, kayaking and jet skiing. Moreover, the beach is also a place for recreation and fishing.

On March 18, 2014, the Crown Prince Al-Muhtadee Billah reopened the beach after the completion of the beach's B$3.45 million renovation. After a high tide in 2018, which caused debris and rubbish to be washed up onto both the beach and nearby roads. From September 20 until 22, 2019, the beach hosted the Inaugural BDYA Sailing Championship 2019. In 2021, recycle bins have been installed Beach cleaning campaign was carried out by the Universiti Brunei Darussalam (UBD) on February 7, 2022.

References

Brunei-Muara District
Beaches of Brunei